Orlyval is a light metro shuttle service at Paris's Orly Airport using the Véhicule Automatique Léger (VAL, English: automatic light vehicle) driverless, rubber-tyred people mover technology. The line, which opened on 2 October 1991, offers free service between the two airport terminal stations, and premium fare service to Antony station, where passengers can connect to the city's RER B trains. Orlyval is the second line to use the VAL technology after the Lille Metro.

The line was financed and initially operated by private companies including Matra, the company that developed the VAL technology, along with several international developers. The line was a commercial failure and the operators went bankrupt. RATP Group, the transportation operator for the Paris region, took over the line in 1992.

History

Orly Airport is the primary airport for domestic flights between Paris and other cities in France. During the 1980s, the only transportation options to the airport were by road. Bus routes to the airport were often crowded and traffic jams were frequent.

Several projects were suggested: an extension of Paris Métro Line 7, an additional branch of the RER B, and an extension of the RER C. Ultimately, in December 1987, authorities opted for the construction of a shuttle line from the airport to Antony station on the RER B line using the Véhicule Automatique Léger (VAL) technology developed by Matra for the Lille Metro which opened in 1983. The project was seen (and criticized) as a showcase project for Matra who was hoping to sell VAL systems to cities across the world.

The government of Jacques Chirac was skeptical about financing the shuttle line and instead offered up a concession: the right for a private company to operate the shuttle line on the airport grounds. A consortium was formed to build the line, consisting of the domestic airline Air Inter (26.7% share), builder Lyonnaise des Eaux-Dumez (18% share), VAL manufacturer Matra (17.3% share), and public transport operator RATP (3.3% share). The other 34.7% of the consortium was owned by several banks including Caisse des Dépôts, Crédit Lyonnais, and Indosuez. With daily ridership forecasted at over 14,000 passengers, the banks helped the group secure loans worth 1.55 billion french francs (about €21.65 million).

The Orlyval opened on 2 October 1991, about three months ahead of schedule. Almost immediately, ridership was lower than expected. Blame was placed on the premium fare, 55 francs (about €8), and the transfer between VAL and RER trains at Antony station. Daily ridership was around 4,500, only a third of the predicted traffic. After a few months of operation, fares were reduced, but ridership remained low. In the first full year of operation, the line only served 1.2 million travelers, instead of the 4.3 million initially forecasted. In December 1992, the line was put into compulsory liquidation.

Operation of the line was taken over by RATP, who would receive an operating subsidy of ten million francs per year until the end of 2021, paid by the Île-de-France region. The settlement also included the requirement that until the end of 2021, a portion of each fare should go to repaying creditors, expected to return about 67% of their original investment. Because of this agreement, fares on the line remained higher than other forms of transportation in the region. As of the end of 2016, the line generated about 10.5 million euros in fares per year.

Ridership increased after the RATP took over operation of the line. The RATP carried out a study of riders in early 1994 and learned the clientele mostly consisted of businessmen traveling between the city and the airport for professional reasons. As a result of the study, in June 1994, RATP increased operating hours of the Orlyval to enable connections to the first and last domestic flights. Since the 2000s, traffic has experienced an annual increase of 8 to 10%. Ridership for the year 2013 amounted to 3.1 million trips.

Fares and ticketing
Travel between the airport's terminals is free of charge. Passengers travelling to or from Antony station must pay, and exit fare gates are in place at Antony for passengers coming from the airport.

The one-way fare for the six-minute ride from Orly to Antony or vice-versa is €9.30 as of August 2017; this is not affected by the fare cap of €5 on RER tickets announced in March 2022. Children aged 4 to 10 pay half fare and babies aged 3 and under are free. Combined tickets valid onwards to a RER station are available with fares depending on the distance travelled. The only other ticket valid for the route is the Paris Visite 1 to 5 day pass; Mobilis day tickets and Navigo season tickets are not valid.

Future 

The Orlyval faces an uncertain future: as part of the Grand Paris Express project, Paris Métro Line 14 is scheduled to be extended to the airport in 2024, offering a direct link to the center of Paris.

The towns of Antony and Wissous as well as the Paris-Saclay community have lobbied to keep the Orlyval line and convert it into something that more closely resembles a metro line for their community, adding three additional stations on the line. However, after more than 30 years in service, the infrastructure needs a major renovation. The other options being considered are the complete dismantling of the infrastructure with possible reuse of the right of way as a cycle path or bus lane.

Orlyval stations

See also

CDGVAL
List of metro systems

References

External links

 
People mover systems in France
Rail transport in Paris
RATP Group